Heavy metal may refer to:

Heavy metals, a loose category of relatively dense metals and metalloids
Toxic heavy metal, any heavy metal chemical element of environmental concern
Heavy metal music, a genre of rock music
Heavy metal genres
Heavy Metal (magazine), an American fantasy comic book magazine

People
Heavy Metal (wrestler) (Erick Francisco Casas Ruiz, born 1970), Mexican professional wrestler
Van Hammer (Mark Hildreth, born 1967), American professional wrestler

Fictional characters
Heavy Metal (G.I. Joe), a character in the G.I. Joe universe
Heavy Metal (Marvel Comics), a group of villains of the Marvel Universe

Songs and albums 
"Heavy Metal (Takin' a Ride)", a 1981 song by Don Felder from the soundtrack of Heavy Metal
"Heavy Metal", a 1981 song by Sammy Hagar from the album Standing Hampton, also on the soundtrack of Heavy Metal
"Heavy Metal: The Black and Silver", a 1981 song by Blue Öyster Cult from Fire of Unknown Origin
"Heavy Metal", a 1985 song by Helloween from Walls of Jericho
"Heavy Metal", a 1988 song by Judas Priest from Ram It Down
"Heavy Metal", a 2005 song by Clap Your Hands Say Yeah from Clap Your Hands Say Yeah
"Heavy Metal", a 2016 song by Justice from Woman
"Heavy Metal x DVNO", a 2018 song by Justice from Woman Worldwide
Heavy Metal Music (album), a 2013 album by Newsted

Video games 
 Heavy Metal (1988 video game), by Access Software
Heavy Metal: F.A.K.K. 2, a 2000 computer game by Gathering of Developers
Heavy Metal: Geomatrix, a 2001 arcade game for Sega NAOMI and Dreamcast by Capcom
HeavyMetal, a series of commercial software titles designed to complement Classic BattleTech

Film and television
Heavy Metal (film), a 1981 animated film based on the magazine
Heavy Metal 2000 a.k.a. Heavy Metal: F.A.K.K.² or "Heavy Metal 2", a 2000 animated film, sequel to the 1981 film Heavy Metal
 Heavy Metal, an episode of the American sitcom sequel The New Leave It to Beaver
"Heavy Metal" (Sliders), a 1999 episode of Sliders
"Heavy Metal" (Terminator: The Sarah Connor Chronicles), a 2008 episode of Terminator: The Sarah Connor Chronicles

Literature
Heavy Metal: A Tank Company's Battle to Baghdad, a 2005 book about Operation Iraqi Freedom
Métal hurlant also called "Heavy Metal", a French comic book

Other uses
Heavy Metal (cricket), an incident in a 1979 cricket match involving Dennis Lillee

See also
 Heavy (disambiguation)
 Metal (disambiguation)
 Heavy rock (disambiguation)